HR 4523 (66 G. Centauri) is a binary star system that is located in the northeastern part of the Centaurus constellation, at a distance of about  from the Solar System. The larger member of the system is a G-type star that is smaller than the Sun but of similar mass. It has a common proper motion companion that was discovered by W. J. Luyten in 1960. This M-type star appears to be in a wide orbit around the primary at a current separation of about 211 astronomical units (AU), (or 211 times the separation of the Earth from the Sun). By comparison, Neptune orbits at an average distance of 30 AU.

Description 
The stellar classification for the primary star in this system is G2V; the same as the Sun. That of the red dwarf companion is M4V. The primary star has an estimated 86% to 89% the mass of the Sun, 96% of the Sun's radius, and 85% of the Sun's luminosity. It is a slow rotator, with a projected rotational velocity of 0.5 km/s. Age estimates range from 4.5 to 5.7 billion years (Gyr) up to 7.1 Gyr or 9.48 Gyr. Compared to the Sun, it only has about 52% of the abundance of elements other than hydrogen and helium; what astronomers term the metallicity of a star.

This star system has a relatively large proper motion. The HR 4523 system is presently located within the Epsilon Indi Moving Group, although it gives itself away as an interloper, since the star is older and has a different composition than the group members. It has space velocity components  = .

Planetary system 

The primary star is believed to be orbited by a Neptune-like planet with a minimum mass 16 times that of the Earth. The orbital period of this planet is 122.1 days. No other planets have been discovered orbiting this star. While a 2013 study was unable to confirm this planet, it was confirmed by a 2023 study, with updated parameters.

An examination of this system in the infrared did not reveal an excess emission that would otherwise suggest the presence of a circumstellar debris disk.

In popular culture
The couch gag for Bart's Not Dead in the television series The Simpsons has an alien family sitting on a couch in this star system. The adult male alien asks why Homer sounds like Walter Matthau.

References

External links
 

G-type main-sequence stars
HR, 4523
Planetary systems with one confirmed planet
M-type main-sequence stars
Binary stars

Centaurus (constellation)
CD-39 07301
0442
Centauri, 66
102365
057433
4523